Nnarambia is a town in Ahiara, Imo state, Nigeria.  It is made up of five hamlets: Ama-obu, Amakpaka, Umuezereugwu, Umunnachi, and Ofor na Obia.

The population of Nnarambia is over 25,000. There are also many citizens of Nnarambia in various parts of the world. It has four schools namely, St. Bridgid's Nursery School, Community Primary School, Central Primary School, and Ahiara Technical College (ATC) - first of its kind in the entire former Eastern Region and where many of the Biafra ammunitions were manufactured.

The famous Ahiara Junction is located in Nnarambia.  This four-road junction connects Owerri and Umuahia in one direction, and the cross-direction connects Aba - Port Harcourt and Mbano - Okigwe. Some yards from this junction is the Eke Nnarambia market. 

The Eze of Nnarambia is EZE Pius Onyekwere the Eze Nfunala IV of Ahiara who was recently installed. The seat of the traditional ruler of Nnarambia people is known as Nfulala.

During the Nigerian Civil War (6 July 1967 – 13 January 1970) (or the "Nigerian-Biafran War"), it was at Nnarambia that the famous Ahiara Declaration took place, in which General Chukwuemeka Oduemegwu Ojukwu launched his vision of new Biafra. The old Empire Day celebrations for schools in the Owerri and Port Harcourt provinces of Eastern Nigeria used to take place in Nnarambia.

The community is predominantly Roman Catholic. The Roman Catholic missionaries from Ireland that brought Christianity to Mbaise first arrived and settled in this community.  Nnarambia is the host parish of the Ahiara Mbaise Catholic Dioceses. The Dioceses awaits a replacement of a new Bishop following the death of Bishop Victor Adibe Chikwe  who died in 2010.

Nnarambia people are industrious farmers well known for producing yam crops, oil palm produce, and various crafts. Many people from the area are Engineers, Professors, Doctors, Lawyers, Teachers, Architects, Economists, Civil workers to mention a few as well as many successful business personnels.

Nnarambia is endowed with great cultural heritage. The great 'Ekpe Dance & Canival' takes place annually on August 15 which is also the time for the celebration of new yam festival (Ji Mbaise). Christmas is celebrated in Nnarambia on the first Eke Market day following 25 December with accompanying masquerade dance 'Mmanwu','Ekpo', music and dance. The Omugwo and child naming ceremony is part of the cultural heritage. The 'Okwukwu' ceremony is the funeral rite during which the 'Ese' and 'Agborogwu'for men and 'Uko' for women are played to entertain mourners and celebrate the good life of the deceased.

The political structure of Nnarambia consists of the Eze (paramount leader) in council with his cabinet, that is ndi Nze na Ozo and red-cap chiefs from each of the five hamlets. The Age Grade associations and general assembly of the people as represented in the Nnarambia Development Union (NDU) are all part of the governance structure. The village has Aladimma for law making and settling of disputes such as family inheritance issues, land, etc. Basically they are republican in their political orientation. Aladimma Nnarambia, a town hall meeting, holds regularly to discuss issues facing the village.   

Nnarambia citizens are known for their resolute character, creativity, and hospitality.

There is Nnarambia Health Centre & Maternity and other private hospitals. The community has public tap water, electricity, and mobile telephone services. There are also branches of various commercial banks located in Nnarambia.

Hotels and recreation centers serving the area includes; Chris VI, Alpha Paradise Hotel Eke Ahiara, Hilman Castle Hotel Afo Oru, Back-to-Land Hotel, etc.

Nnarambia Football Association (NFA) organises annual football league tournament between November and January.

Towns in Imo State